Benzyl benzoate/disulfiram (trade name Tenutex) is a combination drug used in the treatment of scabies. It consists of the antiparasitic insecticides benzyl benzoate and disulfiram.

References

Combination drugs